The Kosovar Coalition party is a party that has 5 minor parties combined to make a larger party. The parties in the Coalition are: 
New Kosovo Party
pro-European Party of Kosovo
Democrats of Kosovo Party
Albanian Alliance
and Gorani Federals Party.

Leader : Driton Jygams

Political party alliances in Kosovo